Galway (Ceannt) railway station (Ceannt Station / Stáisiún Cheannt) serves the city of Galway in County Galway.
The station itself is located in the centre of the city in Eyre Square.

It is the terminus station for the Dublin to Galway intercity service and the Limerick to Galway and Athenry to Galway commuter services.

Description

There are two platforms at Galway Ceannt; Platform 1 and Platform 2. Platform 2 can only be reached via Platform 1. Platform 1 is used for terminating/departing trains to Dublin Heuston while Platform 2 (a much shorter platform) is used for departing Limerick services.

The services which are provided at the station include ticket machines, a booking office, heated waiting rooms, toilets, a café (Starbucks), vending machines, and a telephone box.

The station also serves as the Bus Éireann depot for Galway City.

History

The station opened on 1 August 1851. This made Galway the western terminus of the Midland Great Western Railway giving the city a direct main line to its Broadstone Station terminus in Dublin.

As the 19th century progressed the rail network in Connacht was expanded, making Galway an important railhead. The nearby town of Athenry became a railway junction, giving Galway links to Ennis, Limerick and the south in 1869 and Sligo and the north in 1894. In 1895 the MGW opened an extension between Galway and Clifden.

The 20th century brought increasing road competition, and this led the Great Southern Railways to close the Clifden extension in 1935.
In the 1970s the state railway authority Córas Iompair Éireann closed the Sligo-Athenry-Ennis line to passenger services. It later closed to freight as well.

It was given the name Ceannt on 10 April 1966 in commemoration of Éamonn Ceannt, one of the executed leaders of the Easter Rising of 1916.

Developments

In 2007, CIÉ proposed a series of updates to the station as part of a projected new urban quarter development in the area. This proposed development, referred to as the "Ceannt Station Quarter", was projected to cost €1 billion and include the development of offices and a hotel as well as "four rail platforms, 24 bus bays, 500 car spaces, dedicated taxi drop off and collect facilities, and 300 cycle spaces" at the station. This CIÉ project had been "abandoned" by 2012.

In 2013, 1 million euros was reportedly allocated on a "bus/rail/taxi interchange at the station, with widened footpaths, 'properly designed' bus bays, and revised taxi arrangements". In addition, approximately €100,000 was allocated for design work on an "interchange area for bus and rail passengers [..] a seated waiting area, retail units, vending area and a new office for bus inspectors". By 2014, an additional €600,000 was allocated for further work on the interchange area, and a related planning application was submitted to Galway City Council.

In early 2020, it was reported that a planning application, overlapping somewhat with the earlier "Ceannt Station Quarter" proposal, was due to be lodged with the city council by development company Edward Holdings. This proposed development project, titled "Augustine Hill", would cover an eight-acre site around Ceannt Station "if planning permission is granted". While planning was conditionally approved, in 2021 the developer appealed the removal of several buildings (and the reduction in height of others) from a "scaled-back version" of the Augustine Hill proposal.

See also
 List of railway stations in Ireland
 Western Railway Corridor

References

External links

Irish Rail Galway (Ceannt) Station Website (archived 2013)
Galway Transport Information Portal. Includes information on buses serving Ceannt Station

Buildings and structures in Galway (city)
Iarnród Éireann stations in County Galway
Railway stations in County Galway
Railway stations opened in 1851
Transport in Galway (city)
1851 establishments in Ireland
Railway stations in the Republic of Ireland opened in 1851